Central Louisiana (Cenla), also known as the Crossroads, is a region of the U.S. state of Louisiana.

The largest communities in the region as of the 2010 Census were Alexandria (47,893), Natchitoches (18,323) and Pineville (14,555).

Central Louisiana is a land of physical and cultural diversity. Extensive prairies, piney hill region known as the Louisiana Central Hill Country, minor swamplands and deciduous forests make up its geography. It also has clear streams with sandy bottoms and large rivers that carry waterborne freight.

Metro/Micropolitan areas
There is one Combined Statistical Area, one Metropolitan Statistical Area, and four Micropolitan Statistical Areas that include Central Louisiana parishes.

Alexandria Metropolitan Statistical Area (Rapides and Grant parishes)
Fort Polk South-DeRidder Combined Statistical Area
Fort Polk South Micropolitan Statistical Area (Vernon Parish)
DeRidder Micropolitan Statistical Area (Beauregard Parish)
Natchez, Mississippi Micropolitan Statistical Area (Concordia Parish and Adams County, MS)
Natchitoches Micropolitan Statistical Area (Natchitoches Parish)

Region
The economic region is Kisatchie-Delta, described as the Sixth State Planning District for the State of Louisiana, including parishes collectively bordered on the east by the Mississippi River and on the west by the Sabine River. These crossroads initially began in the 1800s as settlers migrated West and have designation as the Louisiana Colonial Trails Scenic Byways, including the historic El-Camino Real East-West Corridor.
 West Central Louisiana (Beauregard, Sabine and Vernon Parishes)

Parishes 
Central Louisiana consists of the following 10 parishes, with population figures given in parenthesis.

 Allen (25,684)
 Beauregard (36,927)
 Catahoula (9,921)
 Concordia (19,920)
 Grant (22,365)
 LaSalle (15,052)
 Natchitoches (39,162)
 Rapides (132,424)
 Sabine (23,977)
 Vernon (50,569)

See also

Intrastate regions
Louisiana History Museum, Alexandria

References

External links
Central Louisiana Chamber of Commerce
Central Louisiana Community Foundation
Arts Council of Central Louisiana
Central Louisiana Economic Development Alliance
Kisatchie-Delta Regional Planning & Development District <--Broken or dead link, May 2017.

 
Regions of Louisiana